Kikuoka is a Japanese surname. Notable people with the surname include:

, Japanese writer
, Japanese footballer

Fictional characters
, a character in the light novel series Sword Art Online

See also
8492 Kikuoka, a main-belt asteroid
Kikuoka Chinese Medicine

Japanese-language surnames